The 1934 Cork Senior Football Championship was the 46th staging of the Cork Senior Football Championship since its establishment by the Cork County Board in 1887.

Beara were the defending champions.

On 26 August 1934, Beara won the championship following a 2-06 to 2-03 defeat of Clonakilty in the final at Castletownbere. This was their third championship title overall and their third title in succession.

Results

Final

Championship statistics

Miscellaneous

Beara became the first division to win the title three years in a row.
Beara and Clonakilty face each other in the final for the third season in a row.

References

Cork Senior Football Championship